Muhamad Nazmi Faiz bin Mansor (born 16 August 1994) is a Malaysian professional footballer who plays for Malaysia Super League club Johor Darul Ta'zim and the Malaysia national team. Nazmi plays mainly as a central midfielder but can also play as an attacking midfielder or as a defensive midfielder, usually deployed as a deep-lying playmaker.

Club career

Harimau Muda
A product of the Sekolah Projek Sukan Selangor & Bukit Jalil Sports School, Nazmi made his way through Harimau Muda B and later was drafted into Harimau Muda A for the 2012 S. League campaign under Ong Kim Swee.

Beira Mar
On 21 May 2012, Nazmi signed a three-year contract with Portuguese club, Beira-Mar after being scouted by the Aveiro based club.

Nazmi made his debut with Beira-Mar in a friendly match against CD Tondela which ended in a 1–1 draw.
Due to his young age, he was frequently drafted into the Under-19 youth team of the club.
He scored his first goal for the Under-19s just a few days after his 18th birthday.
After six months Nazmi terminated his contract with the club due to personal problems

PKNS
Nazmi joined Malaysian Super League side PKNS on a three-year deal after officially terminating his contract with Beira-Mar. Nazmi were given the number 33 on his jersey and made his debut for the club in a league match against Perak on 12 April 2013 which ended in a 2–2 draw, during which he set up both goals for his team, which were both scored by Patrick Wleh. Nazmi scored his first goal for the club in a 1–0 win against Negeri Sembilan on 22 June.

Selangor
Nazmi left PKNS halfway of the season and officially joined Selangor on 21 April 2014, having signed a contract valid for two and a half years with Selangor until 30 November 2016. Nazmi was slapped with a six-match ban by the Football Association of Malaysia disciplinary committee for spitting at Kelantan's Erwin Carrillo in a Super League match at the Shah Alam Stadium on 19 April 2015. Nazmi then helped the club win the 2015 Malaysia Cup after beating Kedah in the final.

Johor Darul Ta'zim
In December 2016, Nazmi left Selangor and signed a two-year contract with champions Johor Darul Ta'zim.

Nazmi made his competitive debut in the 2017 AFC Champions League qualifying play-offs against Bangkok United. He scored his goal for the club in a 3–0 victory against Boeung Ket Angkor during the 2018 AFC Cup group stage. At the end of the season, he picked up a Malaysia Super League medal and help lifted a 4th consecutive title for Johor.

International career

National U-23
At the age of 17, Nazmi were selected for the 2011 Southeast Asian Games in Indonesia where Malaysia national under 23 team won the gold medal. He scored his first international goal against Bahrain national under 23 team during the 2012 Olympic qualification at the Bukit Jalil National Stadium. He also participated in 2013 Southeast Asian Games, 2015 Southeast Asian Games and 2014 Asian Games.

National Team
Nazmi Faiz made his official debut for Malaysia in a friendly against Kuwait on 8 November 2013.

Career statistics

Club

International

Honours

Selangor
 Malaysia Cup: 2015

Johor Darul Ta'zim
 Malaysia Cup: 2017,2019, 2022
 Malaysia Super League: 2017, 2018,2019, 2020, 2021
 Malaysia Charity Shield: 2018, 2019, 2020, 2021, 2022
 Malaysia FA Cup: 2022

Malaysia U-23
 Southeast Asian Games: 2011

Malaysia
King's Cup runner-up: 2022

Individual
 AFC Cup 2017 – Allianz Goal of the Tournament

References

External links
 
 

1994 births
Association football midfielders
Footballers at the 2014 Asian Games
Living people
Malaysia international footballers
Malaysia Super League players
Malaysian expatriate footballers
Malaysian expatriate sportspeople in Portugal
Expatriate footballers in Portugal
Malaysian footballers
Malaysian people of Malay descent
PKNS F.C. players
S.C. Beira-Mar players
Selangor FA players
Sportspeople from Kuala Lumpur
Southeast Asian Games gold medalists for Malaysia
Southeast Asian Games medalists in football
Competitors at the 2011 Southeast Asian Games
Asian Games competitors for Malaysia